Scott Donald Pruett (born March 24, 1960) is a former American race car driver who has competed in NASCAR, CART, IMSA, Trans-Am and Grand-Am. He and his wife Judy have three children and are children's book authors.

Pruett started racing go karts at the age of 8 and went on to win 10 professional karting championships. In the 1980s, he established himself as a top American sports car racer, eventually winning two IMSA GTO championships and three Trans-Am Series championships.

In the 1990s, Pruett was a regular in the CART series. From 1988 to 1999, he made 145 starts with two wins, five poles and 15 podiums (top-three finishes). During pre-season testing in 1990, Pruett was involved in a serious crash at the West Palm Beach Fairgrounds temporary circuit in West Palm Beach, Florida, where he seriously injured both his legs. Pruett spent the 1990 season recovering and on certain occasions calling ESPN IndyCar telecasts as color commentator with Paul Page doing the play by play.

In 1994 he joined the reformed Pat Patrick team in CART series, testing Firestone tires. Later that same year, he won the Trans-Am Series championship. In 1995, he drove full time for Patrick Racing using Firestone tires in Firestone's return to the CART series and won his first race in a thrilling last-lap duel with Al Unser Jr. at the Michigan 500. In 1997, he won his final CART series race at Surfers Paradise Australia (Nikon Indy 300).

Following his Champ Car career, Pruett raced the 2000 season in the NASCAR Winston Cup Series with PPI Motorsports, although with little success, achieving just one top-10 and finishing 37th in the points standings. He then moved back to sports-car racing and won his third Trans-Am Series championship in 2003. Since 2004, he has raced in the Grand-Am Rolex Sports Car Series for Chip Ganassi Racing. Pruett was a regular starter at NASCAR road course races and was often referred to as a Road Course Ringer. Pruett has won 11 American sports car championships, five in Grand-Am (2004, 2008, 2010, 2011, 2012), to go along with previous championships in IMSA GTO (1986, 1988), Trans-Am Series (1987, 1994, 2003) and IMSA GT Endurance (1986).

Career

1980s
Pruett began racing in karts at the age of eight. In 1984, he moved to sedan racing. His first victory took place in 1986, when he won the IMSA GTO Championship, which he would again win in 1988. In 1987, Pruett won the SCCA Trans-Am championship. At the Indianapolis 500, he was the co-rookie of the year in 1989, recording his best finish in four starts in the race, 10th, driving for Truesports.

1990s
While driving for the Truesports racing team, on March 16, 1990, during pre-season testing for the 1990 season, Pruett suffered leg and back injuries in a crash at the West Palm Beach Fairgrounds temporary circuit.

Pruett won the opening round of the 1991 IROC series season at Daytona. In 1994, Pruett joined Patrick Racing as a test driver for Firestone tires. The same year, he also won the IMSA 24 Hours at Daytona, and also won a second Trans-Am Series championship.

For the next 4 years, Pruett continued driving Indy Cars for Patrick Racing and usually made the top ten in the series championship. In 1995 he was in contention for the Indy 500 until crashing late with 18 to go, although soon he won his first CART race at the Michigan 500 by beating Al Unser Jr. by .56 seconds. His best CART career championship finish was in 1998 finishing sixth in points with three podium finishes and one pole position.

In 1999, Pruett changed to Arciero-Wells and participated in the Toyota engine-program development. He also earned Toyota's first pole on an oval (California Speedway) and earned Toyota's best qualifying effort on a road course at the current time (third at the Australian Grand Prix).

2000s
In 2000, Pruett raced the No. 32 Tide-sponsored Ford for Cal Wells in the Winston Cup Series. Replaced by Ricky Craven after the season, he briefly retired from  NASCAR, but returned in 2001 to win the 24 Hours of Le Mans LMGTS Class in a factory Chevrolet Corvette C5-R. The following year, he won the GTS class in the 24 Hours at Daytona and also joined Speed as a reporter. For them he covered the 2002 FedEx Championship Series as well as the Champ Car World Series in 2003. This year, Pruett also won the Trans-Am Championships in the Motorock Trans-Am Series for Rocketsports Racing.

In 2001, Scott Pruett made a number of NASCAR starts as a "road-course ringer," both in the Winston Cup Series and the Busch Series. For the Cup Series, he drove at Sonoma for Andy Petree and then at Watkins Glen for Chip Ganassi. For the Busch Series, Pruett drove one single race in place of Kevin Lepage at Watkins Glen in what Pruett felt was "likely his best chance to win, perhaps in his career." With Lepage's car, Pruett won the pole position and dominated early on before falling back to finish eighth. Fellow ringer Ron Fellows took the win.

In 2002, at Watkins Glen, Pruett replaced Jimmy Spencer in the No. 41 car for a one-race deal. Pruett started 19th and spent most of the race in the top 10. He finished sixth after getting an opportunity to steal a win from winner Tony Stewart. The next year in 2003 Pruett drove the No. 39 Ganassi car for Sonoma and Watkins Glen. At the Glen, Pruett finished second, his career-best finish. Pruett had almost pulled off the victory by taking advantage of cautions to climb through the field, leading 9 laps in the process. However, that was the year that Robby Gordon swept the road courses and, as a result, Pruett never mounted a significant challenge against Gordon for the win.

In 2004, Pruett was scheduled to run three races driving the No. 39 Target-sponsored Dodge for Chip Ganassi Racing and the No. 09 for James Finch. At Sonoma, Pruett spent all his time in the top ten, leading one lap and nearly winning, but finishing in 3rd spot behind his teammate Jamie McMurray. Pruett was the only road ringer to lead laps in that race. At Indianapolis, Pruett found his No. 09 Dodge losing an engine and his race finishing in an abrupt end. At Watkins Glen, Pruett did not qualify after qualifying was rained out. At Sonoma in 2005, Pruett ran some of the race in the top ten but crashed late in the race. At Watkins Glen later that year, Pruett originally didn't qualify the No. 39 car due to rain. However, he ran the 2005 Sirius at the Glen in the No. 40 Coors car for Ganassi after Sterling Marlin left the race to attend his father's funeral. Starting 43rd due to the driver change, Pruett charged through the field to finish 4th after briefly contending for the win.

In 2006, Pruett returned to the Busch series in the No. 1 car for James Finch. Pruett had a promising race at Watkins Glen during the Zippo 200, starting second and finishing 10th. He drove the No. 40 car for the road-course races in Cup as well. Pruett managed to take advantage of a last-lap crash to charge from 12th place to finish sixth during the final lap of the AMD at the Glen.

In 2007, he won the overall race and Daytona Prototype in the Rolex 24 at Daytona, with Juan Pablo Montoya and Salvador Durán in the No. 01 Telmex, Target, Lexus Riley for Chip Ganassi Racing. Later that same year he nearly won his first Nationwide Series victory at the Telcel-Motorola Mexico 200 at the Mexico City road course only to lose it in the closing laps when his Chip Ganassi teammate the aforementioned Juan Pablo Montoya spun him out and Montoya would win his first NASCAR race. Pruett would recover to a 5th-place finish, his best Nationwide finish at that time. After the race however Pruett was none too pleased with his teammate stating, "that was...nasty, dirty driving".

Later at Montreal in 2007, Pruett had a promising run and was in third spot on a restart with 3 laps left. In the first turn a hard-charging Kevin Harvick slammed into the back of Pruett who spun and collected Ron Fellows, Ron Hornaday Jr., Jeff Burton, Brad Coleman, and Scott Wimmer. Pruett recovered from the spin and was running 4th on the final lap but ran out of gas, finishing 14th after leading 9 laps. To add insult to injury, Harvick won the race.

The next week at Watkins Glen, Pruett was running 3rd with less than 30 laps to go and got a speeding penalty on pit road. After slipping to 33rd after the penalty, Pruett spent the rest of the race charging back towards the lead. Pruett was running 11th on the final lap but got spun out by fellow road racer Ron Fellows, throwing both of them into the final-turn gravel trap. Pruett recovered for an 18th-place finish while Fellows finished 24th.

The year 2008 was very successful for Pruett. He drove the No. 40 Fastenal-sponsored Dodge Charger for Chip Ganassi again in the NNS series sharing the ride with close friend Dario Franchitti who was trying out the NASCAR series. Pruett dominated the Mexico City Nationwide series event, but lost the lead with 8 laps to go during a battle with Kyle Busch. Pruett finished 3rd - his career-best finish in the Nationwide series. In qualifying the NAPA Auto Parts 200 at Montreal, Pruett claimed the pole. The 2008 NAPA 200 in Montreal is his last career start in the NASCAR Xfinity series.

He won the overall race and in the Daytona Prototype Class at the 2008 Porsche 250 at Barber Motorsports Park and also the Rolex Sports Car Series Daytona Prototype season championship. In the Daytona Prototype Class at the Mexico City 250 he made the second place overall. Moreover, Pruett won the closest finish in the history of Grand-Am at the time, beating Alex Gurney in the finish to the 2008 Brumos Porsche 250 held at Daytona International Speedway by 0.081 seconds, after 145 minutes of racing.

2010s

Pruett was racing for Chip Ganassi in the Grand-Am Series during the 2010 season. In July, Hendrick Motorsports chose him as a standby driver should Jeff Gordon have to miss Watkins Glen due to the birth of his son. Pruett, combined with Memo Rojas, won 9 of 12 races to win another Grand-Am Rolex Championship.  The nine victories was a series record.

In 2011, Pruett won the 24 Hours of Daytona, his fourth overall victory in the event.

In 2012, Pruett was one of the commentators for Speed Channel's coverage of the 24 Hours of Le Mans.

Pruett once again led Ganassi Racing to their 3rd Rolex Series Championship in-a-row with Co-driver Memo Rojas. The team put the No. 01 Telmex BMW Riley on the podium for 9 out of 14 races, top five for 10 out of 14 races with only 2 wins on the season, besting 2nd place Ryan Dalziel by 12 points. This year's results mark Ganassi's 4th title in 5 years, and Pruett's 5th Rolex title.

In 2013 Pruett opened on a strong note, winning the 51st Rolex 24 at Daytona with co-drivers Memo Rojas, Juan Pablo Montoya, and Charlie Kimball. 2013 marks his fifth win at the annual endurance race, tying the legendary Hurley Haywood for most victories in the grueling twice around the clock race.  Despite some serious set-backs during the 2013 season, including accruing 0 points at Detroit, the Championship came down to the last race, with the 01 Ganassi Team taking the Team Title, but Jordan Taylor and Max Angelelli taking the Driver's Title under Wayne Taylor Racing/Velocity Worldwide, with Pruett and Rojas taking 2nd place in the Driver's Standings.

In 2014, Pruett competed in the Tudor United SportsCar Championship for a full season with longtime co-driver Memo Rojas in the Prototype Class.

In 2015 Joey Hand joined Pruett in the 01 for the full season.  The team saw some very disappointing results early in the year due to the aging Riley chassis being outclassed by the Corvette Daytona Prototype.  However, despite not having won a race until late in the season, the 01 had remained consistent enough to be in the championship battle by the last race of the season Petit Le Mans.  By the end of the rain-shortened race only 8 points separated the top 4 teams with CGR taking the top spot.

Pruett departed CGR in 2016 and joined with Paul Gentilozzi, who fielded a Lexus RC F GT3 in the WeatherTech SportsCar Championship. The team was not ready for competition until sometime after the 12 Hours of Sebring. He later announced that he would be driving for Action Express Racing part-time for the season.

On January 5, 2018, Pruett announced his retirement after 50 years in racing, following the 2018 Rolex 24 at Daytona.

Personal life
Pruett worked for several years as a commentator for Champ Car races on Speed Channel. He is well known for his trackside interviews, frequently interjecting the greeting "Hi to my family at home" mid-sentence when answering a question. On January 26, 2017, he was named to the Motorsports Hall of Fame of America.

Scott and his wife have also opened Pruett Vineyards in Northern California. In November 2012 their Lucky Lauren Red was given a score of 93 points from Wine Spectator.

In 2021, he returned to Chip Ganassi Racing as the strategist for IndyCar rookie and seven-time NASCAR Cup champion Jimmie Johnson.

Motorsports career results

12 Hours of Sebring results

American open-wheel racing results
(key)

CART

NASCAR
(key) (Bold – Pole position awarded by qualifying time. Italics – Pole position earned by points standings or practice time. * – Most laps led.)

Sprint Cup Series

Daytona 500

Nationwide Series

24 Hours of Le Mans results

Supercars Championship results
(key) (Races in bold indicate pole position) (Races in italics indicate fastest lap)

Complete IMSA SportsCar Championship results
(key)(Races in bold indicate pole position, Results are overall/class)

References

External links
 

Living people
1960 births
Sportspeople from Roseville, California
Racing drivers from California
24 Hours of Daytona drivers
24 Hours of Le Mans drivers
Indianapolis 500 drivers
Indianapolis 500 Rookies of the Year
Rolex Sports Car Series drivers
Champ Car drivers
NASCAR drivers
International Race of Champions drivers
Trans-Am Series drivers
Supercars Championship drivers
WeatherTech SportsCar Championship drivers
International Kart Federation drivers
12 Hours of Sebring drivers
Chip Ganassi Racing drivers
Corvette Racing drivers
Action Express Racing drivers
Rocketsports Racing drivers
Jaguar Racing drivers
Meyer Shank Racing drivers